Atal Bihari Vajpayee Medical University (ABVMU) is a state government run affiliating university in Lucknow, Uttar Pradesh (India). It was opened from a transit campus at Vibhuti Khand, Lucknow and gave affiliation to all government and private medical, dental, paramedical and nursing colleges in the state of Uttar Pradesh. It was established by Uttar Pradesh act no. 42 of 2018, although 2020 is considered as its establishment year, in which appointment of first vice-chancellor happened.

History 
The university, which is one of its kind, came into talks around 2018 and the construction started in 2019. The foundation was laid by current Indian prime minister , Narendra Modi on 25 December 2019. The university was expected to open by mid-2020 in its initial phase which was halted for a year due the COVID-19 Pandemic in early 2020. It became fully functional in academic year of 2021–22 from a transit campus at Vibhuti Khand, Lucknow. It affiliated all medical, dental, nursing and paramedical college of Uttar Pradesh from academic year 2021–22 and also conducted entrance examination for its affiliated paramedical and nursing colleges for academic year of 2021–22.

In its first phase, the university will have complete infrastructure to house a state-of-the-art auditorium and administrative block. The second phase will see establishment of a hospital and teaching facilities. State medical education department has invited tenders from major construction agencies and PWD is the nodal agency for the project.

Vision
To be one of the best medical hub for providing comprehensive teaching, training and research to all health care workers.

Mission 
To serve the society by providing adequately trained manpower which can cater to the health needs, beginning from prevention to primary care to tertiary care.

Courses
The university offers MBBS course of 4.6 years + 1 year internship, dental courses of 4 years + 1 year internship, paramedical courses of 3 and 4 years respectively and nursing courses of 2-4 years. The admissions have started from academic year 2021–22 onwards.

Vice-chancellors
According to the university's act, tenure of the first vice-chancellor will be only for two years; after that every vice-chancellor will get a tenure of three years.

List of vice-chancellor(s)
 A.K. Singh (2020–present)

References

External links
University act

Medical and health sciences universities in India
Universities in Uttar Pradesh
Memorials to Atal Bihari Vajpayee
Universities and colleges in Lucknow
Educational institutions established in 2020
2020 establishments in India
Universities established in the 2020s
Medical colleges in Uttar Pradesh